Raush Manfio Lourenço (born November 3, 1991) is a Brazilian professional mixed martial artist who competes in the lightweight division of the Professional Fighters League. On October 27, 2021, he won the PFL lightweight championship belt. Fight Matrix had him ranked a top 10 lightweight in the world in May 2022. He is currently ranked #16.

Personal life 
Manfio was born in Porto Alegre, Rio Grande do Sul, Brazil on November 3, 1991.

Manfio is best friends with two-time PFL Lightweight champion Natan Schulte. Schulte is the godfather of Manfio’s daughter.

Mixed martial arts career 
Manfio began competing in professional MMA in 2011 in his native Brazil, with against Demetro Borges in Brazil's Valiant FC 8 promotion. He debuted in the United States at Titan FC in 2016. From November 2017 to June 2018, he held the role of Titan FC lightweight champion, after defeating Chazz Walton via knockout in the first round. He lost the title to Sidney Outlaw at Titan FC 50. Before signing with PFL, Manfio hadn't fought in three years and was working teaching MMA and as janitor.

The Ultimate Fighter 
In March 2015, it was announced that Manfio was one of the fighters selected to be on the UFC reality show The Ultimate Fighter: Brazil 4. Manfio was eliminated by eventual lightweight season winner Glaico França.

Professional Fighters League 
Manfio made his PFL debut as a short notice replacement for Olivier Aubin-Mercier against Joilton Lutterbach on April 23, 2021 at PFL 1. He won the bout via split decision.

After being initially booked as a short notice replacement for Mikhail Odintsov against his teammate Natan Schulte at PFL 4 on June 10, 2021, Manfio was later rebooked against Anthony Pettis at PFL 6 on June 25, 2021 after Pettis pulled out of his previous bout due to illness. Manfio won the close bout via split decision.

In the semi finals of the Lightweight tournament, Manfio faced Clay Collard on August 13, 2021 at PFL 7. Manfio won the bout via unanimous decision.

Manfio faced Loik Radzhabov in the Finals of the Lightweight tournament on 27 October 2021 at PFL 10. He won the bout via unanimous decision, winning the 2021 PFL Lightweight Tournament and $1 million dollar prize.

In February 2021, YouTuber Jake Paul hired Manfio to spar with him in preparation for Paul's fight against former Bellator and ONE Welterweight Champion Ben Askren. As of 2022, Manfio trains at American Top Team in Coconut Creek, Florida.

Manfio faced Don Madge on April 23, 2022 at PFL 1. In a comeback fashion, Manfio won the bout after dropping Madge in the third round and finishing with ground and pound.

Manfio faced Olivier Aubin-Mercier on June 17, 2022 at PFL 4. He lost the bout via unanimous decision.

Championships and accomplishments

Mixed martial arts 
 Professional Fighters League
 2021 PFL Lightweight Championship
 Titan FC
 Titan FC Lightweight Championship (One time)
 One successful title defence

Mixed martial arts record

|-
|Loss
|align=center| 16–4
|Olivier Aubin-Mercier
|Decision (unanimous)
|PFL 4
|
|align=center|3
|align=center|5:00
|Atlanta, Georgia, United States
|
|-
|Win
|align=center| 16–3
|Don Madge
|TKO (punches)
|PFL 1
|
|align=center| 3
|align=center| 2:42
|Arlington, Texas, United States
| 
|-
|Win
|align=center| 15–3
|Loik Radzhabov
|Decision (unanimous)
|PFL 10 
|
|align=center|5
|align=center|5:00
|Hollywood, Florida, United States
|
|-
|Win
|align=center| 14–3
|Clay Collard
|Decision (unanimous)
|PFL 7 
|
|align=center|3
|align=center|5:00
|Hollywood, Florida, United States
|
|-
|Win
|align=center| 13–3
|Anthony Pettis
|Decision (split)
|PFL 6 
|
|align=center|3
|align=center|5:00
|Atlantic City, New Jersey, United States
|
|-
|Win
|align=center| 12–3
|Joilton Lutterbach
|Decision (split)
|PFL 1 
|
|align=center| 3
|align=center| 5:00
|Atlantic City, New Jersey, United States
|
|-
|Loss
|align=center| 11–3
|Sidney Outlaw
|Decision (unanimous)
|Titan FC 50
|
|align=center| 3
|align=center| 5:00
|Fort Lauderdale, Florida, United States
|
|-
|Win
|align=center| 11–2
|Lee Henry Lilly
|Decision (unanimous)
|Titan FC 48
|
|align=center| 3
|align=center| 5:00
|Coral Gables, Florida, United States
|
|-
|Win
|align=center| 10–2
|Chazz Walton
|KO (punch)
|Titan FC 46
|
|align=center| 1
|align=center| 3:08
|Pembroke Pines, United States
|
|-
|Win
|align=center| 9–2
|Martin Brown
|Decision (unanimous)
|Titan FC 45
|
|align=center| 3
|align=center| 5:00
|Pembroke Pines, Florida, United States
|
|-
|Loss
|align=center| 8–2
|Matt Frevola
|Decision (unanimous)
|Titan FC 43
|
|align=center|3
|align=center|5:00
|Coral Gables, Florida, United States
|
|-
|Win
|align=center| 8–1
|Demarques Jackson
|TKO (punches and elbows)
|Titan FC 41
|
|align=center| 3
|align=center| 1:42
|Coral Gables, Florida, United States
|
|-
|Win
|align=center| 7–1
|Luis Zequeira
|KO (knee)
|Titan FC 39
|
|align=center| 2
|align=center| 4:52
|Coral Gables, Florida, United States
|
|-
|Win
|align=center| 6–1
|Douglas Saraiva
|TKO (doctor stoppage)
|Gringo Super Fight 10
|
|align=center| 1
|align=center| 5:00
|Nova Iguaçu, Brazil
|
|- 
|Win
|align=center| 5–1
|Oton Jasse
|Decision (unanimous)
|Face to Face 6
|
|align=center| 3
|align=center| 5:00
|Rio de Janeiro, Brazil
|
|- 
|Loss
|align=center| 4–1
|Fernando dos Santos
|Decision (unanimous)
|Watch Out Combat Show 29
|
|align=center| 3
|align=center| 5:00
|Rio de Janeiro, Brazil
|
|-
|Win
|align=center| 4–0
|Patrick Gomes Silva
|Decision (unanimous)
|Circuito Team Nogueira de MMA 3
|
|align=center| 3
|align=center| 5:00
|Rio de Janeiro, Brazil
|
|-
|Win
|align=center| 3–0
|Tiago Rocha
|TKO (punches)
|Conquista Kombat Championship
|
|align=center| 2
|align=center| 0:53
|Vitória da Conquista, Brazil
|
|-
|Win
|align=center| 2–0
|Marcilio Villas Boas
|KO (knee)
|Black Belt Fight
|
|align=center|1
|align=center|N/A
|Vitória da Conquista, Brazil
|
|- 
|Win
|align=center| 1–0
|Demetro Borges
|KO (knee)
|Valiant Fighters Championship 8
|
|align=center| 3
|align=center| 2:49
|Ribeirão Preto, Brazil
|
|-

Mixed martial arts exhibition record

| Loss
| align=center| 0–1
| Glaico França
| Submission (Rear-Naked Choke)
| The Ultimate Fighter: Brazil 4
| February 2, 2015
| align=center| 2
| align=center| 2:46
| Las Vegas, United States
|

See also
List of male mixed martial artists
List of current PFL fighters

References

External links
 

1991 births
Living people
Brazilian male mixed martial artists
Lightweight mixed martial artists
Sportspeople from São Paulo